The World Squash Doubles Championship has been held in North America since 1981 when it was sanctioned by the International Squash Racquets Federation.  It has been held bi-annually since 1994 where it has alternated with the World Softball Doubles. Under the WSF rules, double pairs must be made up of two players from the same country. The WSF event has been held since 1997, being Australia 2019 last edition.

Format
In its most recent format, teams enter through their national governing body and the event is sanctioned by the WSF.

The championships are played on courts measuring 32 feet (9.75 metres) by 25 feet – a court size approved by the World Squash Federation in 1992 for the international doubles game. This court size is the same depth as courts for the singles game, but appears to be slightly wider (singles courts are 21 feet wide).

A separate world championship event, known as the World Hardball Doubles Squash Championships (organised by the Squash Doubles Association), is also held once every two years for players of the hardball version of doubles squash (which is played with a different type of ball, on courts measuring 45 feet by 25 feet).

Competitors
Countries who have competed include Australia, Canada, England, India, Ireland, New Zealand, Pakistan, Scotland and U.S.A.

Past winners

Under  &

Under

Under

External links
World Squash Federation
Squash Doubles Association
2019 WSF World Doubles Championships
2017 SDA World Doubles Championships

Squash tournaments